Consett was a county constituency, centred on the town of Consett in County Durham. It returned one Member of Parliament (MP) to the House of Commons of the Parliament of the United Kingdom, elected by the first past the post voting system from 1918 to 1983.

History

Creation 
Consett was created under the Representation of the People Act 1918 for the 1918 general election. It succeeded the abolished North West Division of Durham, comprising the whole of that seat, excluding Tanfield, which was included in the new constituency of Blaydon, and Lanchester, which was transferred to Barnard Castle.

Boundaries

1918–1950 

 The Urban Districts of Annfield Plain, Benfieldside, Consett, Leadgate, and Stanley; and
 in the Rural District of Lanchester, the parishes of Craghead, Ebchester, Healeyfield, Knitsley, and Medomsley.

1950–1983 

 The Urban Districts of Consett and Stanley.

Only minor changes - the Urban Districts of Annfield Plain and Tanfield (transferred back from Blaydon) had been merged with Stanley; and Benfieldside and Leadgate with Consett, along with the parishes of Ebchester and Medomsley.

Abolition 
The seat was abolished for the 1983 general election as a result of the periodic review of parliamentary constituencies following the re-organisation of local government under the Local Government Act 1972. On abolition, eastern areas, comprising the former Urban District of Stanley, were included in the newly created constituency of North Durham, and eastern areas, comprising the former Urban District of Consett, were transferred back to North West Durham (which had been re-established in 1950).

Members of Parliament

Election results

Elections in the 1910s

Elections in the 1920s

Elections in the 1930s 

General Election 1939–40:
Another General Election was required to take place before the end of 1940. The political parties had been making preparations for an election to take place and by the Autumn of 1939, the following candidates had been selected; 
 Labour: David Adams

Elections in the 1940s

Elections in the 1950s

Elections in the 1960s

Elections in the 1970s

See also 

 History of parliamentary constituencies and boundaries in Durham

References 

 

Parliamentary constituencies in County Durham (historic)
Constituencies of the Parliament of the United Kingdom established in 1918
Constituencies of the Parliament of the United Kingdom disestablished in 1983
Consett